The Leeds municipal election was held on 9 May 1968. Following extensive boundary changes, the whole council was up for election. The re-warding increased the number of wards by two, up to 32 wards, raising in-turn the councillor total by six, to 90, and the aldermen total up two to 30.

In total ten wards were abolished, twelve created and eighteen remained.

Abolished:
Allerton
Blenheim
Cross Gates
Far Headingley
Hunslet Carr
Hyde Park
Meanwood
Potternewton
Wellington
Westfield

Created: 
Burley
Castleton
Chapel Allerton
Cookridge
Gipton
Headingley
Scott Hall
Seacroft
Talbot
Weetwood
West Hunslet
Whinmoor

 

 

The election followed national patterns of the Conservatives inflicting resounding defeats upon the Labour party, winning representation in all but five wards with a crushing 75 seats at the hand of their highest vote since 1951 and a record vote share. Labour representation was confined to City, East Hunslet, Holbeck and Middleton (although coming within a straw for the third seat in Whinmoor) as they picked up their lowest post-war vote and vote share. The Labour collapse also seen the smaller party make gains, as the Liberals won representation on the council for the first time in the post-war period via comfortably winning the three newly created Castleton seats and the Communists, who fielded a full-slate for the first and only time, more than tripled their previous records in both vote share and vote figure.

As a result, the Conservatives gained control of the council for the first time since 1952, with a whopping majority of 80.

Election result

The result had the following consequences for the total number of seats on the Council after the elections:

Ward results

References

1968 English local elections
1968
1960s in Leeds